Cudworth is an English locational surname, of Old English origin, deriving from the locations of Cudworth in Yorkshire, Somerset or Surrey. although the Yorkshire location is the most likely. 

John de Cudworth (d.1384) married Margery the daughter of Richard de Oldham (lord of the manor of Werneth, Oldham, Lancashire) and the Cudworths were lords of the manor until 1683. Ralph Cudworth (1572/3–1624) was the son of Ralph Cudworth (d.1572) of Werneth Hall, Oldham.

Surname

Ralph Cudworth (1617–1688) and family 
 Damaris Cudworth Masham (1659–1708), English writer, theologian, and proto-feminist (daughter)
 James Cudworth (c.1612–1682), American colonist and Deputy Governor of Plymouth Colony (brother)
 Ralph Cudworth (1572/3–1624), English Anglican clergyman, royal chaplain, and theologian (father)
 Ralph Cudworth (1617–1688), English Anglican clergyman, Christian Hebraist, Classicist, theologian and philosopher

Others 
 Andrew Gordon Cudworth (1939–1982), English physician and medical researcher
 Cyril "Charles" Leonard Elwell Cudworth (1908–1977), English librarian and musicologist
 Eddie Cudworth (1911–1990), Canadian long-distance runner
 Edward Aldrich Cudworth (1861–1937), American architect
 Henry Cudworth (1873–1914), English cricketer
 James I'Anson Cudworth (1817–1899), Locomotive Superintendent of the South Eastern Railway
 James Alaric Cudworth (1858–1943), professional baseball player
 Tom Cudworth (b.1964), American screenwriter

Given name 
 Colonel Benjamin Cudworth Yancey Jr. (1817–1891), American lawyer, politician, soldier, and diplomat
 Norman Cudworth Armitage (1907–1972), American saber fencer

See also 
 Cudworth (disambiguation)

References 

Surnames
Surnames of English origin